Jorge Emanuel Magalhães Teixeira (born  5 June 1995 in Felgueiras) is a Portuguese footballer who plays for Portimonense S.C. as a forward.

Football career
On 12 October 2014, Teixeira made his professional debut with Portimonense in a 2014–15 Segunda Liga match against Santa Clara.

References

External links

Stats and profile at LPFP

1995 births
Living people
Portuguese footballers
Association football forwards
Liga Portugal 2 players
Portimonense S.C. players
People from Felgueiras
Sportspeople from Porto District